Immanuel Baptist Church can refer to the following:

 Immanuel Baptist Church (Wichita, Kansas), a large, historic Southern Baptist church located in downtown Wichita, that covers over two city blocks. Immanuel was organized in 1910 and for many years was the largest Baptist church in Kansas or Nebraska. 

 Immanuel Baptist Church (Newton, Massachusetts), a building designed by Henry Hobson Richardson

 Immanuel Baptist Church (Rochester, New York), listed on the NRHP in New York, U.S.

 Immanuel Baptist Church (Salt Lake City, Utah), listed on the NRHP in Salt Lake City, Utah, U.S.

 Immanuel Baptist Church (Yangon, Burma)